"Forever Not Yours" is the first single from the A-ha album Lifelines. It was sent to radio stations in parts of Europe on 22 February 2002 (15 April in Belgium) and was released commercially on 2 April.

The cover of the commercial release features a closeup shot of the black front end of a 1950s Cadillac standing on flatland. The A-ha logo in dark red is in the top right hand corner of the sleeve with the title in black letters underneath. The reverse of the sleeve features more flatland which has been fenced off with a small blue and white wooden panel. The sky is blue grey above with the A-ha logo in white letters at the top and track information in black underneath. The disc itself is a picture disc, showing the steering wheel and dash board photographed from inside the car. The A-ha logo is in silver at the bottom of the disc with title in white underneath. The photographs used on this single were taken by Andy Frank.

Words by Morten Harket and Ole Sverre Olsen
Music by Magne Furuholmen and Morten Harket
Produced by Stephen Hague and Martin Landquist
Additional arrangement by Keller, Schroeder 
Recorded at Lydlab Studios, Oslo and Strongroom, London

Formats and track listing

CD: WEA. / 0927 44859-2 Europe 
"Forever Not Yours" - (4:08)
"Differences" (Original Demo) - 2:49
"Hunting High And Low" (Live In Oslo) - 7:07
"Manhattan Skyline" (Live In Oslo) - 6:14

Forever Not Yours video
Director: Harald Zwart
The video was filmed on location in Cuba. 
The theme of the video was based on the Biblical floods and Noah's Ark. 
There are many famous faces entering the 'VIP entrance' in this video, including look-a-likes for Desmond Tutu, Madonna, Lenny Kravitz, and Elizabeth II.
In the final scene, A-ha once again makes fun of themselves: the VIP entrance turns out to be an entrance to a work hall for the crew. 
Morten: " 'Forever Not Yours' is one of those songs that sums us up. Melancholy, and at the same time uplifting - soaring."

Charts

MTV Unplugged appearance 
In 2017, A-ha appeared on the television series MTV Unplugged and played and recorded acoustic versions of many of their popular songs for the album MTV Unplugged – Summer Solstice in Giske, Norway, including "Forever Not Yours".

References

2002 singles
A-ha songs
Number-one singles in Norway
Number-one singles in Poland
Songs written by Magne Furuholmen
Song recordings produced by Stephen Hague
Songs written by Morten Harket
Warner Music Group singles
Desmond Tutu
Cultural depictions of Elizabeth II
Cultural depictions of Madonna